The 11th Congress of the Communist Party of the Soviet Union was held during 27 March – 2 April 1922 in Moscow. The congress was attended by 522 with a casting vote alongside 165 with consultative vote, and elected the 11th Central Committee.

The main purpose of the congress was to review the results of the New Economic Policy that was decided in the 10th Congress. As a result, the congress concluded that the capitalist mixed economy in the Soviet Union would need to come to an end. This led them to resolve that the trade unions were to be given more power in both the economy and politics.

Background 
During the 11th Congress, Leon Trotsky attacked Sergey Ivanovich Gusev and Mikhail Frunze over Red Army policies, specifically matters of discipline, political doctrine, and relations with the peasantry. Trotsky lost the debate, which resulted in a discrediting of civilian critics of the Red Army. As a result, civilians were increasingly locked out of military-related resolutions following the 11th Congress.

The most far-reaching event was the appointment of Joseph Stalin as the party's first General Secretary. Bukharin and Rykov were promoted to the Politburo.

The main organs that been presented in the session, Lenin declared that the retreat—the concessions to private-economic capitalism—has been completed, a link with the peasant economy is being established, the alliance between the working class and the peasantry has been strengthened, and economic achievements are evident. He put forward a new task: first, to halt the economic retreat and regroup forces to attack the capitalist elements provided to its limits of tolerance for capitalism in the conditions of the transitional period were established and tested in practice, the expansion of the scope for the development of capitalism in a diversified economy had halt necessary to gradually involve the peasant masses in building socialism on the basis of the wide use of trade and commodity-money relations. 

He also pointed out that, every members of the ruling Bolsheviks how to manage and prove that the communists know how to manage the economy better than the capitalists. Lenin put forward the slogan "learn to trade" and called on the communists to improve the organization of the management of the national economy and raise culture. He sharply criticized arrogance, covering up mistakes and shortcomings; emphasised the need for the correct selection and placement of personnel, the organization of a systematic verification of performance. 

The congress approved the political and organizational line of the Central Committee and indicated in the resolution that the concessions made to private-economic capitalism have been exhausted and the next task is to regroup the party forces with the aim of launching an offensive against the western elements. The resolution cleated out the distinction in the work of party and Soviet bodies, drew attention to the increased role of the All-Russian Central Executive Committee and local Soviets as practical leaders of economic life. 

Having approved the activities of the representatives of the CPUSSR in the ECCI, the congress fully agreed with the tactics of the united front pursued by the Comintern. Particular attention was given to enhancing the role of trade unions under the NEP. They must become the closest and indispensable employees of the state power in all its political and economic activities. In the resolution on financial policy, measures were developed to strengthen the exchange rate of the ruble, increase state income, stabiliSe prices, etc. The resolution “On Work in the Countryside” condemned attempts at administrative pressure on agricultural institutions and cooperation. The main task of party work in the countryside was recognised as providing practical assistance to the peasantry in increasing agricultural production. 

Much attention at the congress was devoted to raising the theoretical and ideological level of the communists, improving the qualitative composition of the party, and strengthening its ranks. The conditions for admission to the party were changed: it was difficult for "uncleanly proletarian elements" to join its ranks. 

The congress finally approved the resolution of the XI All-Russian Conference of the RCP coded "On the question of strengthening the party, in connection with the experience of checking its personnel." In its resolution on the issue of the Red Army, the congress recognized the need to continue work to increase its combat effectiveness.
The final report was heard from the commission created by the congress, which considered the question of some members of the former "workers' opposition" which, contrary to the decision of the tenth congress in 1921 on the liquidation of all factions, continued factional activities. On the eve of the congress, they addressed the Comintern with a statement in which they set out their point of view on the situation in the party and the country, pointing out the departure of the party from the interests of the working class. The congress condemned the activities of the former ruling leaders.

References

External links
Speeches by V. I. Lenin at the Eleventh Congress Of The R.C.P.(B.), Collected Works, 2nd English Edition, Progress Publishers, Moscow, 1965, Volume 33, pages 237-242
Report to the Eleventh Congress of the Russian Communist Party (Bolsheviks), 29 March 1922 by Leon Trotsky; THE MILITARY WRITINGS OF LEON TROTSKY; Volume 4: 1921-1923

Communist Party of the Soviet Union 11
Congress
1922 conferences
March 1922 events
April 1922 events